A partial lunar eclipse took place on Friday, April 23, 1948. A tiny bite out of the Moon may have been visible at maximum, though just exactly 2.3% of the Moon was shadowed in a partial eclipse which lasted for 34 minutes and 18 seconds. A shading across the moon from the Earth's penumbral shadow should have been visible at maximum eclipse.

Visibility

Related lunar eclipses

Lunar year series

Saros series 

Lunar Saros 111, repeating every 18 years and 11 days, has a total of 71 lunar eclipse events including 11 total lunar eclipses. The first total lunar eclipse of this series was on April 19, 1353, and last was on August 4, 1533. The longest occurrence of this series was on June 12, 1443 when the totality lasted 106 minutes.

Half-Saros cycle
A lunar eclipse will be preceded and followed by solar eclipses by 9 years and 5.5 days (a half saros). This lunar eclipse is related to two annular solar eclipses of Solar Saros 118.

See also
List of lunar eclipses
List of 20th-century lunar eclipses

Notes

External links

1948-04
1948 in science